Yekaterina Strizhenova (Russian: Екатерина Владимировна Стриженова; born Yekaterina Tokman; March 20, 1968) is a Russian film and stage actress, television presenter.

Yekaterina was born in Moscow, graduated from Moscow Institute of Culture (now Moscow University of Culture and Arts). She made her film debut in 1984 film drama Leader, where she played the role of a high school student Tanya.

Strizhenova is one of the hosts of television program Good Morning (
Dobroe Utro) on Channel One. In 2008 she participated in show Lednikoviy Period (Ice Age), where celebrities paired with professional figure skaters each week compete by performing ice dancing. She was paired with Alexei Tikhonov.
From September 15, 2014 to the present, Ekaterina leads the talk show “Time will Tell ” on Channel One Russia.

Yekaterina is married to actor and director Alexandr Strizhenov (son of actor Oleg Strizhenov), formerly they hosted Good Morning together. The couple have two daughters, Anastasiya (1988) and Alexandra (2000).

References

External links

1968 births
Actresses from Moscow
Living people
Russian film actresses
Russian stage actresses
Russian television presenters
Russian women television presenters
Sanctioned due to Russo-Ukrainian War